Nasa Q'ara (Aymara nasa nose, q'ara bare, bald, "bare-nosed", also spelled Nasacara) is a mountain in the Bolivian Andes which reaches a height of approximately . It is located in the La Paz Department, Loayza Province, Luribay Municipality. Nasa Q'ara lies northwest of Llawlli Pata and southeast of Jisk'a Uma.

References 

Mountains of La Paz Department (Bolivia)